Connellia varadarajanii is a plant species in the genus Connellia. This species is endemic to Venezuela.

References

varadarajanii
Flora of Venezuela